Radenbeck is a village in the town of Wittingen in the district of Gifhorn in the north German state of Lower Saxony.

Location 
Radenbeck lies 13 kilometres southeast of the town of Wittingen and, like it, on the B 244 federal road.

The parish extends from the River Ohre to the east, a tributary of the Elbe, it rises towards the west, and is on a gentle, northeast facing slope. The state border with Saxony-Anhalt runs along the Ohre 1.1 kilometres away.

Sources 
 Edeltraud Hundertmark: Der Landkreis Gifhorn, II. Gemeindebeschreibungen mit statistischem Anhang. Teil 2: Mahrenholz bis Zicherie. (Die Deutschen Landkreise. Handbuch für Verwaltung, Wirtschaft und Kultur. Reihe D: Die Landkreise in Niedersachsen Bd. 26, II), pp. 587–592.

References 

Gifhorn (district)
Wittingen
Villages in Lower Saxony